Pratapa tyotaroi is a butterfly of the family Lycaenidae first described by Hisakazu Hayashi in 1981. It is endemic to the Philippines. On Mindanao island it is distributed on Mount Apo, Mount Kitanglad and Mount Masara.

Its forewing length is 13–18 mm.

Subspecies
F. Danielsen and Colin G. Treadaway (2004) categorized subspecies P. t. cadohaana as vulnerable and subspecies P. t. ismaeli as lower risk, conservation dependent. There are four subspecies:
Pratapa tyotaroi tyotaroi H. Hayashi,[1981] (Marinduque and Luzon)
Pratapa tyotaroi ismaeli H. Hayashi, Schrőder & Treadaway, [1983] (Mindanao)
Pratapa tyotaroi mindorensis Treadaway & Nuyda,[1998] (Mindoro)
Pratapa tyotaroi cadohaana Seki,[1997] (Leyte)

References

Hayashi, Hisakazu (1981). "New Lycaenid Butterflies from the Philippines". Tyô to Ga. 32 (1,2): 63–82.
Treadaway, C. G. (1995). "Checklist of the butterflies of the Philippine Islands (Lepidoptera: Rhopalocera)". Nachrichten des Entomologischen Vereins Apollo. Suppl. 14: 7–118.

Danielsen, F. & Treadaway, Colin G. (2004). "Priority conservation areas for butterflies (Lepidoptera: Rhopalocera) in the Philippine islands:. Animal Conservation, Zoological Society of London. 7: 79-92.
Treadaway, Colin G. & Schrőder, Heinz G. (2012). "Revised checklist of the butterflies of the Philippine Islands (Lepidoptera: Rhopalocera)". Nachrichten des Entomologischen Vereins Apollo. Suppl. 20: 1-64.
Hayashi, Hisakazu (2013). "New record of Deramas manobo and Pratapa tyotaroi ismaeli from Mt. Masara (SE Mindanao Is., the Philippines)". Yadoriga. 237: 30.

Butterflies described in 1981
Pratapa